Florence is a city in Williamson County, Texas, United States. The population was 1,171 at the 2020 census. Since 2000, the territorial limits of Florence has grown by 8%. Florence is part of the  metropolitan area.

History
The site was settled in the early 1850s and briefly called Brooksville. By 1857 it was known as Florence, when its first post office was established.

Florence, a significant cotton processing center, was the original destination of the Bartlett-Florence Railway, later the Bartlett Western Railroad, which ran from a connection at Bartlett, Texas with the Missouri-Kansas-Texas Railroad to Florence.    However, that line, started in 1909, was abandoned in 1935.

Geography

According to the United States Census Bureau, the city has a total area of 0.8 square miles (2.1 km2), all of it land.

Climate
The climate in this area is characterized by hot, humid summers and generally mild to cool winters.  According to the Köppen Climate Classification system, Florence has a humid subtropical climate, abbreviated "Cfa" on climate maps.

Demographics

As of the 2020 United States census, there were 1,171 people, 260 households, and 176 families residing in the city.

As of the census of 2009, the population was 1,148. In 2000, there were 1,054 people, 381 households, and 275 families residing in the city. The population density was 1,300.1 people per square mile (502.4/km2). There were 410 housing units at an average density of 505.7 per square mile (195.4/km2). The racial makeup of the city was 89.28% White, 0.85% African American, 1.04% Native American, 0.28% Asian, 6.74% from other races, and 1.80% from two or more races. Hispanic or Latino of any race were 19.92% of the population.

There were 381 households, out of which 38.8% had children under the age of 18 living with them, 55.4% were married couples living together, 12.6% had a female householder with no husband present, and 27.6% were non-families. 23.9% of all households were made up of individuals, and 12.3% had someone living alone who was 65 years of age or older. The average household size was 2.77 and the average family size was 3.29.

In the city, the population was spread out, with 31.1% under the age of 18, 8.6% from 18 to 24, 28.0% from 25 to 44, 18.9% from 45 to 64, and 13.4% who were 65 years of age or older. The median age was 33 years. For every 100 females, there were 99.6 males. For every 100 females age 18 and over, there were 93.1 males.

The median income for a household in the city was $36,250, and the median income for a family was $42,059. Males had a median income of $30,500 versus $23,750 for females. The per capita income for the city was $15,964. About 9.7% of families and 14.7% of the population were below the poverty line, including 20.2% of those under age 18 and 9.2% of those age 65 or over.

Education
The City of Florence is served by the Florence Independent School District. Florence High School is the only high school in Texas that has a complete meat processing laboratory and full-service meat market.

References

External links

 

Cities in Texas
Cities in Williamson County, Texas
Greater Austin